The Toronto version of the NWA British Empire Heavyweight Championship was a major singles title in that city's NWA affiliate, Maple Leaf Wrestling, from 1941 until 1967, when the title was abandoned.

Title history

See also
List of National Wrestling Alliance championships

References

External links
NWA British Empire Heavyweight title history (Toronto)

National Wrestling Alliance championships
Maple Leaf Wrestling championships
Heavyweight wrestling championships
National professional wrestling championships
Professional wrestling in Toronto